The Geography of Piedmont is that of a territory predominantly mountainous, 43.3%, but with extensive areas of hills which represent 30.3% of the territory, and of plains (26.4%).

To the north and to the west Piedmont is surrounded by the Alps, to the south by the Apennines, and to the east by the Po plain. 

To the west Piedmont borders with France, to the north with Valle d'Aosta and Switzerland, to the east with Lombardy and Emilia Romagna, and to the south with Liguria.

Piedmont is the second largest of the 20 administrative regions of Italy, after Sicily. It is broadly contiguous with the upper part of the drainage basin of the Po which rises from the slopes of Monviso in the west of the region and is Italy’s largest river. The Po collects all the waters provided within the semicircle of mountains (Alps and Apennines) which surround the region on three sides. 

From the highest peaks the land slopes down to hilly areas (not always, though, sometimes there is a brusque transition from the mountains to the plains), and then to the upper, and then the lower Pianura Padana. The boundary between the first and the second is characterised by risorgive, springs typical of the pianura padana which supply fresh water both to the rivers and to a dense network of irrigation canals.

Lago Maggiore and the line of the rivers Ticino and Sesia separate Piedmont from Lombardy. 

The countryside, then, is very varied: one passes from the rugged peaks of the massifs of Monte Rosa and of Gran Paradiso (national park), to the damp rice paddies of the Vercellese and Novarese; from the gentle hillsides of the Langhe and of Monferrato to the plains, often polluted and studded with a mixture of farms and industrial concerns.

Orography

Mountains 

Principal mountains:

Monte Rosa 4634 m
Gran Paradiso 4061 m
Monviso 3841 m
Uia di Ciamarella 3676 m
Monte Leone 3552 m
Rocciamelone 3538 m
Pierre Menue 3505 m
Corno Bianco 3320 m
Punta Ramiere 3303 m
Bric Bouchet 3216 m
Monte Matto 3097 m
Monte Albergian 3041 m
Rocca la Meia 2831 m
Monte Giavino 2766 m
Punta Marguareis 2651 m
Monte Bram 2357 m
Monte Barone 2044 m
Monte Antola 1597 m
Mottarone 1492 m
Monte Musinè 1150 m

Valleys

As Piedmont is bounded to the north and to the west by the Alps, and to the south by the Apennines it is rich in valleys of very varied dimensions. There follows a list of some of the valleys of the region starting at the north of the boundary with Lombardy and proceeding anti-clockwise:
Val d'Ossola
Valle Anzasca
Valle Antrona
Val Bognanco
Val Divedro
Valle Antigorio
Val Formazza
Val Vigezzo
Valsesia
Val Mastallone
Val d'Otro
Val Vogna
Val Sessera
Valle Strona di Mosso
Valle Cervo
Valchiusella
Valle dell'Orco
Valli di Lanzo
Val grande di Lanzo
Val d'Ala
Valle di Viù
Val Ceronda
Val di Susa
Val Sangone
Val Chisone
Val Germanasca
Val Pellice
Valle Po
Valle Maira
Val Varaita
Valle Stura di Demonte
Valle Gesso
Val Bormida
Val Curone
Valle Scrivia
Val Borbera

Hydrography

Rivers

The largest river in Piedmont is the Po.
Other important rivers, in order of their mean rate of discharge, include:

Lakes

The principal lakes of Piedmont are:
Lago Maggiore 212 km²
Lago d'Orta 18.2 km²
Lago di Viverone 5.8 km²
Lago di Mergozzo 1.85 km²
Lago di Candia 1.52 km²
The five lakes of the Serra di Ivrea 
Lago Sirio 1.4 km²
Lago San Michele
Lago Nero
Lago Pistono
Lago di Campagna (or Lago di Cascinette)

References